Eddie Calhoun (November 13, 1921, in Clarksdale, Mississippi – January 27, 1994, in Paradise Lake, Michigan) was an American jazz double bassist.

He worked with Horace Henderson (1952–54), Johnny Griffin (1954), Roy Eldridge, Billie Holiday, and Miles Davis. He joined Erroll Garner in 1955 and played with him through 1966, recording extensively and touring worldwide. After his time with Garner, Calhoun settled again in Chicago, where he played with vocalist and pianist Norvel Reed (1967–68), then ran a nightclub called Cal's in Chicago from 1972 to 1974 and led a sextet at the Fantasy Club from 1975 to 1980. From 1980 to 1986 he accompanied pianist Lennie Capp, then joined the Chicago All-Stars alongside Erwin Helfer for a tour of Europe. Calhoun never recorded as a leader.

Discography

As sideman
With Erroll Garner
 Concert by the Sea (Columbia, 1955)
 Paris Impressions (Columbia, 1958)
 Dreamstreet (ABC-Paramount, 1961)
 Close-up in Swing (Philips, 1961)
 Now Playing (MGM, 1965)
 Campus Concert (MGM, 1966)
 Erroll Garner Plays Gershwin and Kern (MPS, 1976)

With others
 Erwin Helfer, On the Sunny Side of the Street (Flying Fish, 1979)
 Willis Jackson, Shuckin'  (Prestige, 1963)
 Ahmad Jamal, The Piano Scene of Ahmad Jamal (Epic, 1959)

References

1921 births
1993 deaths
American jazz double-bassists
Male double-bassists
20th-century American musicians
Jazz musicians from Mississippi
20th-century double-bassists
20th-century American male musicians
American male jazz musicians